Fade to Black is a 2004 documentary film about the career of American rapper Jay-Z. It also features many other famous names in hip hop music. This live concert at Madison Square Garden was meant to be Jay-Z's final performance, as he announced his intentions to retire from the industry.

Fade to Black runs through some of the major parts of Jay-Z's Madison Square Garden performance while cutting to Jay-Z and his exploits, as well as insights into the making of The Black Album.

Cast
The following musicians are credited with an appearance in the film:

Jay-Z
Mary J. Blige
Foxy Brown
Diddy
Damon Dash
Missy Elliott
R. Kelly
Beyoncé Knowles
Usher

References

External links
 
Fade to Black at the TCM Movie Database
 
 
 
 Jay-Z November 25, 2003 setlist at Madison Square Garden at setlist.fm, an external wiki

2004 films
2004 documentary films
Documentary films about hip hop music and musicians
Concert films
Paramount Vantage films
Jay-Z
2000s English-language films